This is a list of public art on the campus of Indiana University – Purdue University Indianapolis organized alphabetically.  These artworks form the Indiana University – Purdue University Indianapolis Public Art Collection.

References

External links
Wikipedia Saves Public Art 2009: A Survey of IUPUI Public Art.

Indiana University – Purdue University Indianapolis Public Art Collection
Culture of Indianapolis
Outdoor sculptures in Indianapolis
Indiana University